Several Canadian naval units have been named HMCS Shearwater.

 , a commissioned sloop and later submarine tender in the Royal Canadian Navy from 1914 to 1919 
 CFB Shearwater, a Canadian Forces Base formerly commissioned as a shore establishment of the Royal Canadian Navy from 1948 to 1968

References

 Government of Canada Ship's Histories - HMCS Shearwater

See also

Royal Canadian Navy ship names